The 2002 Supertaça Cândido de Oliveira was the 24th edition of the Supertaça Cândido de Oliveira, the annual Portuguese football season-opening match contested by the winners of the previous season's top league and cup competitions (or cup runner-up in case the league- and cup-winning club is the same). The match took place on the 18 August 2002 at the Estádio do Bonfim in Setúbal, and was contested between 2001–02 Primeira Liga and 2001–02 Taça de Portugal winners Sporting CP, and cup runners-up Leixões. This competition is notable as this would be the only silverware Cristiano Ronaldo won with Sporting before his transfer to Manchester United less than a year later. 

Played in front of a crowd of 6,000, the Leões defeated the Heróis do Mar 5–1. Goals in either half from attacking midfielder Ricardo Fernandes, strikes from Sporting strikers Marius Niculae and Vitali Kutuzov, and an 87th-minute goal from Carlos Martins saw Sporting CP defeat the opposition comfortably and raise the club's tally to five trophies in this competition.

Match

Details

References

Supertaça Cândido de Oliveira
2002–03 in Portuguese football
Sporting CP matches
Leixões S.C.